Jerry Gabriel León Nazareno (born 22 April 1995) is an Ecuadorian footballer who plays as a defender for Olmedo in the Ecuadorian Serie A.

References

External links
Profile at Copa Sudamerica Official Website

1995 births
Living people
C.D. Cuenca footballers
Deportivo Azogues footballers
C.D. Universidad Católica del Ecuador footballers
C.D. Técnico Universitario footballers
Zulia F.C. players
Ecuadorian Serie A players
Ecuadorian Serie B players
Venezuelan Primera División players
Ecuadorian footballers
Association football defenders
C.S. Norte América footballers